Cyperus palianparaiensis is a species of sedge that is native to parts of India. The species was first described by Ethirajalu Govindarajalu in 1990.

See also 
 List of Cyperus species

References 

palianparaiensis
Plants described in 1990
Flora of India